In the 2015–16 season, Associazione Calcio Milan competed in the Serie A for the 82nd time, as well as the Coppa Italia. It was their 33rd consecutive season in the top flight of Italian football.

Milan finished in seventh place in Serie A, failing to qualify for European competition for a third season in a row. Milan also reached the final of the Coppa Italia, losing to rivals Juventus after extra time.

Squad information

Transfers

Summer 2015

In

On loan

Loan returns

Total spending:  €86,470,000

Out

Loans ended

Loaned out

Total income:  €11,150,000
Net income:  €75,320,000

Winter 2015–16

In

Loan returns

Total spending:  €0

Out

Loaned out

Total income:  €2,400,000
Net income:  €2,400,000

Pre-season and friendlies

Milan began their pre-season campaign taking on Italian lower division sides A.S.D. Alcione and A.S.D. Legnano in Solbiate Arno. Milan won both these first matches, with Nigel de Jong scoring the first goal of the season.

Milan was then involved in matches against several European top level cubs, including Lyon, Internazionale and Real Madrid in the International Champions Cup, and Bayern Munich and Tottenham Hotspur in the 2015 Audi Cup.

On 12 August, Milan won the 2015 TIM trophy after again defeating Inter and Sassuolo (the later after penalties) after two matches of 45 minutes each.

After the start of the season, Milan played other friendlies, mainly during October and November, including the Berlusconi Trophy and the Trofeo ‘San Nicola.

Competitions

Serie A

The 2015–16 Serie A season will begin on 22 August 2015 and will conclude on 15 May 2016.

League table

Results summary

Results by round

Matches

Coppa Italia
The 2015–16 Coppa Italia began in August with Milan entering the competition in the third round. Their first match was against Serie B side Perugia and was played on 17 August 2015, following a request by Milan to delay the match by two days due to other pre-season obligations. Milan opened the score early through Keisuke Honda and then within 20 minutes, scored again through Luiz Adriano, who scored his first official goal for the club.

Milan then advanced into the fourth round where Crotone was defeated after extra time. Luiz Adriano during regular time, and Giacomo Bonaventura and M'Baye Niang during extra time were the scorers. Further in December, Milan also ruled out Sampdoria in an emotions limited match, thanks to Niang and Carlos Bacca goals, earning the right to face Carpi in the quarter-finals.

Milan played its first Coppa Italia match in 2016 against Carpi on 13 January. The Rossoneri progressed to the semi-finals by beating Reggio Emilia side with 2−1 at a moderately attended San Siro. Bacca gave Milan the lead after 14 minutes of play with a fine rabona, then Niang found himself on the scoresheet just before the half-hour mark. Milan will face Alessandria in a two-legged semi-final encounter.

In a rather tedious match, Milan came out victorious against Alessandria in the first leg of the Coppa's semi-finals. Mario Balotelli converted a penalty kick into a game-winning goal just before half-time. In the second leg, played at San Siro, Milan easily outplayed Alessandria and won the semi-finals 6–0 on aggregate. Jérémy Ménez scored a doppietta, while Alessio Romagnoli and Balotelli scored one goal each. Alessandria's Roberto Sabato also scored an own goal.

Milan then traveled to Rome to meet Juventus in the final on 21 May at Stadio Olimpico. The Rossoneri were defeated by Álvaro Morata's goal during the second period of extra time, despite being arguably the better opponent in the final, controlling the ball possession and the pace of the match and creating more scoring chances.

Statistics

Appearances and goals

|-
! colspan="14" style="background:#dcdcdc; text-align:center"| Goalkeepers

|-
! colspan="14" style="background:#dcdcdc; text-align:center"| Defenders

|-
! colspan="14" style="background:#dcdcdc; text-align:center"| Midfielders

|-
! colspan="14" style="background:#dcdcdc; text-align:center"| Forwards

|-
! colspan="14" style="background:#dcdcdc; text-align:center"| Players transferred out during the season

Goalscorers

Last updated: 21 May 2016

Disciplinary record

Includes all competitive matches. Players listed below made at least one appearance for A.C. Milan first squad during the season.

References

A.C. Milan seasons
Milan